Nova Corp can refer to:
Nova Corps, a fictional intergalactic military/police force appearing in Marvel Comics
Nova (eikaiwa), a large eikaiwa school (private English teaching company) in Japan